The Javkhlant Formation is a geological formation in Mongolia whose strata date back to the Late Cretaceous possibly Santonian to Campanian. Ceratopsian, ornithopod and theropod remains been found in the formation. A prominent fossilized therizinosauroid nesting site is also known from the formation.

Paleobiota of the Javkhlant Formation

Dinosaurs

See also 
 List of dinosaur-bearing rock formations

References 

Geologic formations of Mongolia
Upper Cretaceous Series of Asia
Cretaceous Mongolia
Santonian Stage
Campanian Stage
Sandstone formations
Mudstone formations
Alluvial deposits
Ooliferous formations
Paleontology in Mongolia
Formations